Vodenovo ( or ) is a small settlement in the hills northwest of Šmarje pri Jelšah in eastern Slovenia. The area was historically part of the Styria region and is now included in the Savinja Statistical Region.

References

External links
Vodenovo at Geopedia

Populated places in the Municipality of Šmarje pri Jelšah